Oliver Scott Sykes (born 20 November 1986) is a British singer and songwriter, best known as the lead vocalist of the rock band Bring Me the Horizon. He also founded the apparel company Drop Dead Clothing, and created a graphic novel.

Early life
Sykes was born on 20 November 1986, in Ashford, Kent, England. As an infant, he moved to Australia with his parents, Ian and Carol Sykes, moving between Adelaide and Perth during a period of about six years. The family returned to the United Kingdom when Sykes was about eight, settling in Stocksbridge in Sheffield, South Yorkshire. As a teenager, he attended Stocksbridge High School then Barnsley College.

Career

Womb 2 Da Tomb, Purple Curto and Olisaurus pseudonym (2000–2004)
In early 2000, while still in school, he began crafting compilation CDs and short tracks under the name Quakebeat. He also played in the mock hip-hop band "Womb 2 Da Tomb" with his brother Tom Sykes and fellow Bring Me the Horizon member Matt Nicholls, and in metal band "Purple Curto" with Neil Whiteley, as the drummer/vocalist under the pseudonym "Olisaurus", which he would later use when releasing solo material.

Bring Me the Horizon (2004–present)

In 2004, Sykes formed Bring Me the Horizon. The band released their debut EP This Is What the Edge of Your Seat Was Made For in 2004, then releasing their debut album, Count Your Blessings in 2006. Their second album Suicide Season was released on 29 September 2008, their third studio album There Is a Hell Believe Me I've Seen It. There Is a Heaven Let's Keep It a Secret. on 4 October 2010, they released their fourth studio album Sempiternal on 1 April 2013 which features the new member Jordan Fish and Sykes playing rhythm guitar for the album and they released their fifth studio album That's the Spirit on 11 September 2015, their sixth album Amo was released on 25 January 2019. On 27 December 2019, they released their commercial release Music to Listen To.... On 30 October 2020, they released another commercial release Post Human: Survival Horror.

Collaborations and other musical projects
Sykes has been featured in songs for the bands You Me at Six's "Bite My Tongue", Architects' "Even If You Win, You're Still a Rat", Admiral's Arms' "Dawn of the New Age" and Deez Nuts' "If You Don't Know, You Know Now". He is also featured on a music video of American rock band A Day to Remember's "All I Want".

In 2017, Sykes featured as guest vocalist in the song "Silence Speaks" with English metalcore band While She Sleeps.

Sykes was briefly featured in the music video for Charli XCX's song "Boys" along with other artists such as Brendon Urie, Denzel Curry, Charlie Puth and Stormzy.

Sykes has also collaborated with DJ Skrillex as the backing vocals of a Bring Me the Horizon song "Visions" off the Bring Me the Horizon album There Is a Hell Believe Me I've Seen It. There Is a Heaven Let's Keep It a Secret.. Skrillex has also remixed a Bring Me the Horizon song "The Sadness Will Never End" off Suicide Season which the remix was featured on the Cut Up! version of the album.

On 27 October 2017, Sykes performed with Linkin Park – who he claims were his first ever concert as a teenager – at Linkin Park and Friends: Celebrate Life in Honor of Chester Bennington. He performed the song "Crawling" with DJ and record producer Zedd on percussion.

Clothing line
In addition to his vocal and songwriting contributions in Bring Me the Horizon, Sykes is also the founder and owner of the alternative clothing line Drop Dead Clothing (stylized as DROP DEAD).

Writing
On 1 February 2013, Sykes launched a Kickstarter project to fund a graphic novel created by him and Drop Dead Clothing artist Ben Ashton-Bell, entitled Raised by Raptors. With a £15,000 goal, the project exceeded its target within weeks of launching, attaining a final total of £39,223.

Influences and legacy

Influences

Sykes has cited Pantera, Black Flag, Misfits, Linkin Park, Simple Plan, Every Time I Die, Skycamefalling, Poison the Well, Norma Jean and The Dillinger Escape Plan as influences.

Vocals and lyrics
Sykes' lyrics have a strong feeling of catharsis for him. He mainly draws from personal experience and has likened the band's live performances to being therapeutic. In 2006, when asked about the lyrics of Count Your Blessings, as they had been criticised for their content fixated on heartbreak or other themes that were called "shallow and meaningless", he responded "My life's never been that bad so I've not got that much to talk about".

Legacy
The main character of the French feature film A Taste of Ink is an admirer of Oliver Sykes and Bring Me the Horizon. He is a post-hardcore singer and wears as a tribute to Oliver Sykes a Michael Jordan black jersey. The French title Compte tes blessures is inspired by the first album of the band Count Your Blessings.

Personal life
Since the age of 12, Sykes has suffered from a form of night terrors known as sleep paralysis, which is the inability to move or speak while falling asleep, or upon waking.

Sykes became a vegetarian in 2003 at age 16 after watching a documentary about animal cruelty online, "When I saw how animals are tortured on factory farms, I couldn't justify being a part of that cruelty." He went on to become one of the faces for PETA, eventually designing charity T-shirts with the slogan "Meat Sucks" via his Drop Dead Clothing line. He turned vegetarian at age 16 before turning vegan 15 years later. His passion for veganism can be seen in his 2018 venture 'Church', an arcade bar with a fully vegan menu based in Sheffield's Kelham Island.

Sykes is an outspoken atheist, stating "I don't believe in God. I was asked to believe in him when I was in a shitty place. I couldn't understand why I needed a god or, in my opinion, something that doesn't exist." In an interview with Radio.com in 2013, he also stated "In my opinion, I don't think believing in God is a victimless crime. It's not that I'm right and everyone else is wrong. If it was just people believing in God had no effect on the world, then it wouldn't matter. Then you can believe in what you want, if you want an imaginary friend that lives in the clouds that's fine. But it's the fact that it does have an effect on other people and other things and the whole world is in turmoil mainly because of religion, at least a massive part of it."

After receiving the Album of the Year award at the first Alternative Press Music Awards in 2014, Sykes revealed a history of addiction and abuse of the drug Ketamine. Addressing the crowd, he said "My band wanted to kill me, my parents wanted to kill me, my fucking brother wanted to kill me," and also admitted, "I went to rehab for a month, and you guys were sending me texts and e-mails. When I got out of that rehab, I didn't want to scream anymore, I wanted to sing from the fucking rooftops."

On 12 July 2015 in Tuscany, Italy, Sykes married model and tattoo artist Hannah Pixie Snowdon. In 2016, Sykes announced that he and Snowdon had separated. In May 2019, Sykes alleged that their relationship ended due to Snowdon's infidelity, and referred to her as his "ex-wife". Snowdon had admitted to being unfaithful, but alleges abuse and infidelity from Sykes as well. The band's 2019 single, "Medicine" was written about the pair's relationship.

On 22 July 2017, Sykes married Brazilian model Alissa Salls.

In March 2021, Sykes shared a photo on Instagram confirming he stayed in Brazil with his wife for the entirety of the COVID-19 pandemic to that point, that he had acquired a CPF number,  and had bought a house in the city of Taubaté, countryside of the state of São Paulo, where he was living with her.

Controversies

Urination and assault allegation
In 2007, a female fan accused Sykes of urinating on her and accused him and his bandmates of assaulting her. He was put on trial and pled not guilty. The fan took a photo of her face, which appeared to be covered in blood. An employee of venue Rock City in Nottingham, England said: "After the gig, two girls tried to get on the tour bus. Later on, the singer, Oliver Sykes, tried it on with one of the girls. When she said no, he called her a dyke and first pissed on her before him and the rest of the band threw her and her friend off the bus. Once off the bus, someone within the band threw an empty bottle of Jagermeister at the girl's head". Sykes strongly denied the allegations. According to record label Visible Noise Records, "numerous versions of the alleged incident have been posted online". Charges against Sykes were dropped due to a lack of evidence.

Videos with Architects
During a tour in 2008, Bring Me the Horizon and the British metalcore band Architects filmed two videos.  The first showed a fight between Sykes and Architects' lead singer Sam Carter, while the second showed an ambulance with Sykes supposedly inside. The videos were uploaded to YouTube, leading to outrage from many Bring Me the Horizon fans, and resulting in hate mail and death threats being sent to Carter. However, it was later revealed that the videos were a stunt staged by both bands, and that they are in fact good friends. Sykes said, "All-day events can get boring very fast so we conjured up the first idiotic thing we could think of and made it as unbelievable as possible."

Moshing incident
In June 2013, Sykes and Bring Me the Horizon were sued by the parents of a 12-year-old girl due to injuries received in the mosh pit while watching the band's performance during the Warped Tour 2013. This led to Sykes announcing via Twitter that legally he was no longer able to start any form of moshing activities during his concerts. However, Sykes later stated that the suit had been dropped and that moshing was not going to be banned.

Domestic violence allegations
Sykes was accused of domestic violence by his former wife Hannah Pixie Snowdon on Instagram in 2016, alleging that Sykes "slapped and spat" on her. Snowdon also alleged that she "wasn't the first girl this entire pattern happened to."

Discography

Bring Me the Horizon

 Count Your Blessings (2006)
 Suicide Season (2008)
 There Is a Hell Believe Me I've Seen It. There Is a Heaven Let's Keep It a Secret. (2010)
 Sempiternal (2013)
 That's the Spirit (2015)
 Amo (2019)

Singles featured on

Music videos

Bibliography

As writer
 Raised by Raptors (2013–present)

References

External links
 
 

Bring Me the Horizon members
English male singer-songwriters
English atheists
English fashion designers
English heavy metal singers
1986 births
Living people
Critics of religions
English expatriates in Australia
People from Ashford, Kent
People from Stocksbridge
People educated at Barnsley College